Ammi Giddings (1822 – February 13, 1882) was an American lawyer and politician from Connecticut, who was twice elected to the Connecticut Senate. He served as President pro tempore of the Connecticut Senate. He was appointed to the Montana Territorial Supreme Court, but never served.

Giddings was born in Sherman, Connecticut. He graduated from Yale Law School, and was admitted to the bar in 1849. That same year, he married Augusta Bays of Wethersfield. He subsequently practiced law at Plymouth.

In 1857, Giddings was elected to the Connecticut Senate from the state's 16th District, and served as the President Pro Tempore. He was elected again in 1864. On June 15, 1864, President Abraham Lincoln appointed him as an associate justice of the Supreme Court for the newly formed Montana Territory; the United States Senate unanimously confirmed him on June 22.  Giddings resigned immediately due to poor health and never served on the court. However, his commission remained in force until he was replaced in 1865, and histories of the Montana Supreme Court still list him as one of the first justices of that court.

In 1866, Giddings moved to Kalamazoo, Michigan. He returned to Connecticut in 1872, and died at Sherman in 1882.

Notes

Montana Territory judges
Connecticut state senators
Connecticut lawyers
1822 births
1882 deaths
Presidents pro tempore of the Connecticut Senate
19th-century American politicians
People from Sherman, Connecticut
People from Plymouth, Connecticut
19th-century American judges
19th-century American lawyers